Yasir Zafar Sandhu is a Pakistani politician who has been a member of the Provincial Assembly of Punjab, from March 2018 to May 2018 and from August 2018 to January 2023.

Early life and family 
Zafar was born on 21st of October, 1978. He was born in Chak 19, Kotmomin, Sargodha and have two siblings; Usman Zafar Sandhu and Faraz Zafar Sandhu. His father, Zafar Iqbal Sandhu, is a retired Bank official.

Education 
Sandhu got his early education from Sargodha and did his bachelor's degree from Punjab University. He did L.L.B from Quais-E-Azam Law College, Sargodha and served as an advocate in Sargodha Bar.

Political career
He was elected to the Provincial Assembly of Punjab as an independent candidate from Constituency PP-30 (Sarghoda-III) in bye-polls held in March 2018, with the support of Pakistan Muslim League (N) (PML-N). He defeated a candidate of Pakistan Tehreek-e-Insaf Sajid Mehmood.

He was re-elected to Provincial Assembly of the Punjab as a candidate of PML-N from Constituency PP-73 (Sargodha-II) in 2018 Pakistani general election.

References

Punjabi people
Punjab MPAs 2013–2018
Pakistan Muslim League (N) MPAs (Punjab)
Living people
Punjab MPAs 2018–2023
Year of birth missing (living people)